Mordac may refer to:
 Mordac, Earl of Menteith, in 12th century Scotland 
 Mordac, "Preventer of Information Services", a character in Dilbert
 Mordac, a character in Flanders (film)
 MoRDAC, the layout engine used in UZard Web